Nepal competed at the 1972 Summer Olympics in Munich, West Germany.

Athletics
Men's Marathon:
 Jit Bahadur — 2:57:58.8 (→ 60th place) 
 Bhakta Bahadur — did not finish (→ no ranking)

References
Official Olympic Reports

Nations at the 1972 Summer Olympics
1972
1972 in Nepal